Friedericke Leue is a German sprint canoer who has competed since the late 2000s. She won two medals at the 2007 ICF Canoe Sprint World Championships in Duisburg with a silver in the K-1 1000 m and a bronze in the K-4 1000 m events.

References

German female canoeists
Living people
Year of birth missing (living people)
ICF Canoe Sprint World Championships medalists in kayak